Ayiram Muthangal is a 1982 Indian Tamil-language romance film directed by Annakkili S. Devarajan and produced by Thirupur Mani. The film stars Sivakumar, Radha, Jose and Charuhasan. It was released on 5 March 1982.

Plot 

Murali, a law school graduate struggling to make a living and Shakthi are in love but break up due to misunderstandings. Shakthi marries Visu and soon realises his sadistic and violent behaviour. Visu also fosters a friendship with Murali eventually forcing Shakthi and Murali into confrontation.

Cast 
Sivakumar as Murali
Radha as Shakthi
Jose as Visu
Charuhasan as Raghuram
Y. G. Mahendran as Raju
Kallapetti Singaram as Boopathi
Loose Mohan
Chandrahasan
Silk Smitha
Vanitha as Kanagu
Pasi Sathya

Soundtrack 
Soundtrack was composed by Shankar–Ganesh.

Reception 
Kalki said the colourfulness in the title was absent in the film.

References

External links 
 

1980s romance films
1980s Tamil-language films
1982 films
Films scored by Shankar–Ganesh
Indian romance films